Captain John James McGinty III (January 21, 1940 – January 17, 2014) was a United States Marine Corps officer who received the United States militaries' highest 
decoration — the Medal of Honor — for heroism during July 1966 in the Vietnam War.

Early life and education
John McGinty was born on January 21, 1940, in Boston, Massachusetts. He completed grammar school in Louisville, Kentucky in 1955, and attended high school in Louisville for a year and a half prior to enlisting in the United States Marine Corps Reserve on February 19, 1957.

Military service
Upon Discharging from the Marine Corps Reserve, he enlisted in the Marine Corps as active duty on March 3, 1958.

He completed recruit training with the 3rd Recruit Training Battalion, Marine Corps Recruit Depot Parris Island, South Carolina. He then went to advanced infantry combat training with Company M, 3rd Battalion, 1st Infantry Training Regiment, Camp Lejeune, North Carolina. He was promoted to private first class in September 1957, and was transferred to the 7th Infantry Company, USMCR, Louisville, Kentucky, to serve as a rifleman until March 1958.

Private First Class McGinty completed the Noncommissioned Officers Leadership School, Camp Pendleton, California in May 1958. He was then ordered to Marine Barracks, U.S. Naval Station, Kodiak, Alaska until May 1959. While stationed in Alaska, he was promoted to Corporal in September 1958.

Transferred to the 1st Marine Division in June 1959, he saw duty as a rifleman leader, and later, squad leader with Company I, 3rd Battalion, 5th Marines. Upon his return to the United States, he served as Guard/Company Police Sergeant, H&S Battalion, FMF, Atlantic, at Norfolk, Virginia, until March 1962.

From there, he was ordered to Marine Corps Recruit Depot, Parris Island, South Carolina, and assigned duty as Drill Instructor, 2nd Recruit Training Battalion. He was promoted to Sergeant in August 1962.

From November 1964 until December 1965, Sgt McGinty saw duty as Assistant Brig Warden, Marine Barracks, U.S. Naval Base, Norfolk, Virginia.

Sergeant McGinty was ordered to the West Coast for transfer to the Far East. Joining the 4th Marines, 3rd Marine Division, in the Republic of Vietnam in April 1966, he served successively as a platoon sergeant and platoon commander, Company K, 3rd Battalion, as S-2 Officer and Operation Chief, H&S Company, 3rd Battalion, and as Operations Chief, with Headquarters Company, 4th Marines.  It was in 1966, during Operation Hastings, that McGinty distinguished himself in the actions for which he was awarded the Medal of Honor.

Upon his return to the United States in May 1967, he reported to the Marine Corps Recruit Depot, Parris Island, South Carolina. He served as a drill instructor until his promotion to second lieutenant on August 8, 1967. The following day, he assumed his assignment as Series Officer, 1st Recruit Battalion, at the Recruit Depot, Parris Island.

On March 12, 1968, President Lyndon Johnson presented the Medal of Honor to 2ndLt McGinty in a ceremony at the White House in which fellow Marine Robert J. Modrzejewski was also honored.

Captain McGinty retired from the Marine Corps in October 1976.

Later life
In the 1980s McGinty felt that there was a conflict between wearing his Medal of Honor (which bears the image of the Roman goddess Minerva) and his new-found Christian faith. Some news agencies reported that McGinty wanted to return his Medal of Honor.

McGinty died at his home in Beaufort, South Carolina on January 17, 2014. The cause was bone cancer. He was buried at Beaufort National Cemetery.

Pistol stolen and later returned
McGinty's USMC M1911 pistol, mentioned in his Medal of Honor citation, was stolen from a display in 1978. In 2011, history buff George Berry purchased the pistol from an auction. Curious about the name engraved on the pistol, Berry contacted McGinty and subsequently returned the pistol to its rightful owner. McGinty sent back another M1911 pistol previously owned by the late Medal of Honor recipient John William Finn along with a Medal of Honor challenge coin in gratitude.

Awards and decorations
A complete list of his medals and decorations includes: the Medal of Honor, the Purple Heart, the Good Conduct Medal with two bronze stars, the Combat Action Ribbon, the Presidential Unit Citation, the National Defense Service Medal, the Vietnam Service Medal with two bronze stars, the Vietnamese Cross of Gallantry with Palm, and the Republic of Vietnam Campaign Medal.

Medal of Honor citation

Honors
On May 19, 2004, the South Carolina General Assembly passed Bill 5281, a resolution "commend[ing] the extraordinary heroism of Marine Staff Sergeant John J. McGinty III, a native of Massachusetts who entered the service in South Carolina, and who was awarded the Medal of Honor during the Vietnam Conflict for Valor."

See also

List of Medal of Honor recipients for the Vietnam War

References
Inline

General

External links

 Dan Rice (N.Y. National Guard) recounts the 2005 visit of Medal of Honor recipients, including Capt John McGinty to U.S. troops in Iraq entry on meeting the six touring  Medal of Honor recipients, including John McGinty.
John J. McGinty III, War Hero, Dies at 73 The New York Times, 22 January 2014.

1940 births
2014 deaths
United States Marine Corps Medal of Honor recipients
Recipients of the Gallantry Cross (Vietnam)
United States Marines
United States Marine Corps officers
United States Marine Corps personnel of the Vietnam War
People from Boston
Vietnam War recipients of the Medal of Honor
Burials at Beaufort National Cemetery
Military personnel from Massachusetts